Roger Clinton Sr. (July 23, 1908 – November 8, 1967) was an American car salesman. He was the first stepfather of former U.S. President Bill Clinton.

Early life
Roger Clinton was born in Yell County, Arkansas, the son of Allen W. Clinton (August 26, 1880 – June 14, 1965) and Eula Cornwell (May 29, 1882 – October 10, 1975). Clinton was an owner of the local Buick dealership,  and "a handsome, hell-raising, twice-divorced man from Hot Springs, Arkansas". In 1950 he married Virginia Blythe, mother of the future president, whose first husband had died in a car crash in 1946, three months before the birth of their son Bill. Roger Clinton and his family lived at the south end of Hope. Eventually Clinton sold the Buick dealership and moved, with his family, to a four hundred-acre farm a few miles west of Hot Springs. After a year or so on the farm, around 1955, they moved into Hot Springs. In 1956, he and Virginia had their only child, Roger Clinton Jr., in Hot Springs. Roger and Virginia divorced in 1962, but remarried a few months later, after which his stepson took the surname Clinton. Roger Clinton was referred to as "Daddy" in Bill Clinton's presidential memoir My Life.

Personal life
Though Bill loved his stepfather, Roger's alcoholism, gambling, and subsequent abuse of his mother and half-brother would lead to Bill's intervening on numerous occasions with physical force, each time resulting in his stepfather's arrest. Clinton was eventually reconciled with his stepson when Bill Clinton drove down from Georgetown on weekends to visit him at the Duke Medical Center in Durham, North Carolina, after he became ill. Roger's illness recurred later in the fall of 1967. After a period in the  hospital, he requested to come home to die.
Roger Clinton died of cancer aged 59 in 1967.

References

1908 births
1967 deaths
American salespeople
Family of Bill and Hillary Clinton
People from Yell County, Arkansas
Place of death missing
Deaths from cancer in Arkansas